Tomašica can refer to one of the following towns:

 Tomašica, Bosnia and Herzegovina
 Tomašica, Croatia